The Albert Slingerland House is a historic home located at Slingerlands in Albany County, New York.  It was built about 1840 and is a 2-story, frame Greek Revival–style dwelling.  It consists of a 2-story, gable-front main block with a -story side ell with a projecting porch.  Also on the property are two 2-story frame barns dated to about 1840 and a brick smoke house.

It was listed on the National Register of Historic Places in 1997.

References

Houses on the National Register of Historic Places in New York (state)
Greek Revival houses in New York (state)
Houses completed in 1840
Houses in Albany County, New York
National Register of Historic Places in Albany County, New York